"All We Needed" is a song by British singer Craig David. The song was released as a digital download in the United Kingdom on 11 November 2016 by Sony Music. The song features on his sixth studio album, Following My Intuition (2016). It was released as the official single for Children in Need 2016. Peaking at number 42, it was also the lowest-charting Children In Need single for 21 years.

Background
On 11 November 2016, David announced that the song would be the official Children in Need 2016 single.

Track listing

Charts

Release history

References

2016 songs
Songs written by Craig David
Craig David songs
2016 singles
Children in Need singles
Songs written by Tich (singer)
Pop ballads
Contemporary R&B ballads